The Boland women's cricket team is the women's representative cricket team for the South African region of Boland. They compete in the Women's Provincial Programme and the CSA Women's Provincial T20 Competition. They have won two one-day titles and one T20 title.

History
Boland Women first appeared in the 1997–98 season of the Caltrate Inter-Provincial Tournament, although the full results for the tournament are unrecorded. They have competed in every season of the tournament since. Boland have won the tournament twice, in 2003–04 and 2007–08. In 2003–04, they beat Eastern Province in the final by 107 runs, whilst in 2007–08 they won the title by going unbeaten to top the Super Six section of the tournament. The side also finished as runners-up in the tournament three times in four seasons, in 2005–05, 2006–07 and 2008–09.

Boland have also competed in the CSA Women's Provincial T20 Competition since its inception in the 2012–13 season. They won the second edition of the tournament, in 2013–14, beating Northerns in the final after bowling them out for just 32 in the first innings.

Players

Current squad
Based on squad announced for the 2021–22 season. Players in bold have international caps.

Notable players
Players who have played for Boland and played internationally are listed below, in order of first international appearance (given in brackets):

  Denise Reid (1997)
  Helmien Rambaldo (1998)
  Sune van Zyl (1999)
  Alison Hodgkinson (2000)
  Josephine Barnard (2002)
  Madelein Lotter (2002)
  Leighshe Jacobs (2003)
  Alicia Smith (2003)
  Claire Terblanche (2003)
  Ashlyn Kilowan (2003)
  Sunette Loubser (2007)
  Yolandi van der Westhuizen (2009)
  Moseline Daniels (2010)
  Yolandi Potgieter (2013)
  Bernadine Bezuidenhout (2014)
  Stacy Lackay (2018)
  Diviya G K (2018)
  Faye Tunnicliffe (2018)

Honours
 CSA Women's Provincial Programme:
 Winners (2): 2003–04 & 2007–08
 CSA Women's Provincial T20 Competition:
 Winners (1): 2013–14

See also
 Boland (cricket team)

Notes

References

Women's cricket teams in South Africa
Cricket in the Western Cape